Shek Kip Mei is one of the 25 constituencies in the Sham Shui Po District of Hong Kong which was first created in 1982 and recreated in 2015.

The constituency loosely covers Shek Kip Mei Estate with the estimated population of 19,039.

Councillors represented

Election results

2010s

2000s

1990s

1980s

References

Constituencies of Hong Kong
Constituencies of Sham Shui Po District Council
1982 establishments in Hong Kong
2015 establishments in Hong Kong
Constituencies established in 1982
Constituencies established in 2015
Shek Kip Mei